Bianca Bianchi may refer to:

 Bianca Bianchi (politician), Italian teacher and writer
 Bertha Schwarz, opera singer who used the stage name Bianca Bianchi

See also
 Bianco Bianchi, Italian cyclist